The Capt. Nicholas W. and Emma Johnson House is a historic building located in Des Moines, Iowa. The house is an unusual example in Des Moines of Châteauesque design elements added to a late Queen Anne style house. The design was attributed to Des Moines architect Oliver O. Smith and was built by local contractor Charles Weitz. The 2½-story brick structure features large massing, a prominent front-facing gable, two full-height polygonal side bays, steeply pitched hipped roof, smooth and rough wall surfaces, contrasting courses, and the fleur-de-lis motif executed in stone, ceramic tile, and glass.

The house was built for Nicholas and Emma Johnson. He was a sea captain who later farmed in Madison County before he and his second wife Emma settled here in her hometown. While it was built as a single-family house, it was converted into a funeral home in 1933 and it remained as such at least into the 1990s. It was listed on the National Register of Historic Places in 1990.

References 

Houses completed in 1896
Queen Anne architecture in Iowa
Houses in Des Moines, Iowa
National Register of Historic Places in Des Moines, Iowa
Houses on the National Register of Historic Places in Iowa